AD 76 (LXXVI) was a leap year starting on Monday (link will display the full calendar) of the Julian calendar. At the time, it was known as the Year of the Consulship of Titus and Vespasianus (or, less frequently, year 829 Ab urbe condita). The denomination AD 76 for this year has been used since the early medieval period, when the Anno Domini calendar era became the prevalent method in Europe for naming years.

Events

By place

Roman Empire 
 Emperors Vespasianus Augustus and Titus Caesar Vespasianus become Roman Consuls.
 Governor Sextus Julius Frontinus subdues the Silures and other hostile tribes of Wales, establishing a fortress at Caerleon or Isca Augusta for Legio II Augusta, and makes a network of smaller forts for his auxiliary forces.

China 
 First year of Jianchu era of the Chinese Han Dynasty.

By topic

Art and Science 
 Chinese historian Ban Gu develops a theory of the origins of the universe.

Religion 
 Pope Anacletus I succeeds Pope Linus as the third pope of the Catholic Church (according to the official Vatican list).

Births 
 January 24 – Hadrian, Roman emperor (d. 138)

Deaths 
 Linus, pope of the Catholic Church (approximate date)
 Marcus Vettius Bolanus, Roman politician and governor (b. 33 AD)
 Nicanor the Deacon, Greek missionary and martyr
 Quintus Asconius Pedianus, Roman historian (b. 9 BC)

References 

0076